GlobalSpec is a technology services company which provides a search engine of engineering and industrial products, indexing over 180 million parts divided into 2,300,000 product families, from over 24,000 manufacturer and distributor catalogs. GlobalSpec is a domain-specific (or "vertical search") tool, in that its focused domain allows for optimized results. Within product families, searches can be narrowed by selecting values for parameters that are specific to that product type.

The website has over 8 million registered members, and as of 2009, membership was growing at a rate of 20,000 per week. In 2007, the company achieved 35% revenue growth, the sixth year in a row that the company achieved double-digit revenue growth. The website has approximately 1.3 unique million visitors a month with 2.8 million page views and an average of 4.9 minutes time spent. GlobalSpec has partnerships with several well-known companies, including:

 AltaVista
 The International Society of Automation (ISA)
 McGraw-Hill
 Dassault Systemes

SolidWorks which is a product of Dassault Systèmes has embedded access to GlobalSpec's search engine inside its computer-aided design software.

Warburg Pincus sold GlobalSpec to IHS in 2012 for $135 million.

The IEEE acquired GlobalSpec from IHS in 2016.

GlobalSpec was acquired by Compare Networks Inc. on July 31, 2020.

See also
 List of search engines
 Vertical search

References

External links 
 
 CR4 The Engineer's Place for News and Discussion 

Internet properties established in 1996
Domain-specific search engines
Marketing companies of the United States
Online companies of the United States